Andrew Michael Lauer (born June 19, 1965) (also known as Andy Lauer) is an American feature and documentary filmmaker, actor, and social activist.

Lauer is the Founder President & CEO of ReelAid, a non-profit organization made up of filmmakers from the Hollywood community producing low to no-cost promotional videos for other non-profit organizations who in turn use them to fund-raise and create public awareness.

Early life
Lauer was born in Los Angeles to an attorney father and an actress mother. He engaged as an actor from ages 9 to 11 and then stopped for the sake of normal childhood.

Lauer is an athlete and a football player. He captained his high school's gymnastics team.

He attended San Diego State University and then transferred to University of New Hampshire; he chose the Theater & Arts and Journalism there. He worked as a busboy to subsidize his studies at the New York Friars Club, where he was influenced by the comic legends Red Skelton, Milton Berle, Henny Youngman and Lucille Ball. After the completion of his studies, he traveled through Europe and then he settled in New York to start his career. In 1987, he returned to Los Angeles and improved his comedic abilities with The Groundlings and L.A. Connection.

Career
He began his career in front of the camera with major roles in film and TV including Never on Tuesday (with Peter Berg), Born on the Fourth of July (with Tom Cruise), For the Boys (with Bette Midler) and Iron Man 3 (with Robert Downey Jr.). He has mentored under the direction of filmmakers Oliver Stone, Michael Bay, David Fincher and James Burrows.

As an actor, Lauer is probably best known for playing "Charlie" on the NBC comedy series Caroline in the City.

He has directed and produced the feature film Adventures of a Teenage Dragon Slayer starring Lea Thompson (Back to the Future) and Wendie Malick (Racing Stripes). The film was released in theaters Spring 2011 and went on to stay on the family charts for 28 consecutive weeks. Lauer’s recent project, Gridiron Heroes, won Best Feature Documentary at the International Family Film Festival in 2015. The film follows fallen High School footballers and features actor Taylor Kitsch (Friday Night Lights), football legends Mike Ditka, Kurt Warner, Deacon Jones, Dallas Cowboys owner Jerry Jones and Commentator Al Michaels. He was also involved in a sister-project executive produced by Peter Berg (Friday Night Lights, Battleship) titled Head’s Up Tackling.

He also had triple duties directing/writing/producing The Tehuacan Project in 2007, a story about deaf children in rural Tehuacan in Mexico. Lauer's roommate after college, Brad Pitt executive produced. Adrien Brody narrated the film with Esai Morales; Prior to that he received critical acclaim for his feature film Intermedio, a supernatural thriller starring Edward Furlong (Terminator 2: Judgment Day, American History X) and Amber Benson (Buffy the Vampire Slayer) and the multi-award-winning short film, Little Cuba.

Lauer's next project was Sahaya Going Beyond about a ragtag but heroic group working together to fight HIV in India, narrated by Academy Award winner Jeremy Irons. It was completed in 2013.

His next film Prince of Malacca is a love story of reincarnation of a Prince from the Kingdom of Malacca and a Princess from Singapura. In addition to directing this film Lauer will also stand in as a producer.

In 2016, an Indiegogo campaign was launched to help raise $35,000 to fund a gay themed romantic comedy movie entitled "Please Don't Eat the Pansies". The cast included actor/writer Ronnie Kerr, Mary Wilson of The Supremes, singer/actor Tom Goss and Andrew.

Other interests
Lauer developed an interest in toxic mold remediation after a home renovation went awry. He went on to attain professional certifications and start a mold remediation firm in Santa Monica, CA

Filmography

Film

Television

Director

References

External links

 
 BIOGRAPHY - ANDY LAUER as Charlie
 Lauer, Andrew 1965- (Andy Lauer)
 Andy Lauer
 Andy Lauer Biography
 The Beauty of Decay Saga Directors - Andy Lauer
 Andy Lauer - Awards
 Andy Lauer
 “Bellevue Avenue” film to be set in Newport
 

1965 births
Living people
American documentary film directors
American male film actors
American male television actors
Film directors from California
Male actors from Santa Monica, California